The Ostend Science Park is a business incubator and science park of located on the Plassendale site in Ostend (Belgium). The site is aimed towards research and development in the Blue Economy.

History
Due to the expansion of the incubator at the Zwijnaarde science park in Zwijnaarde a new location was needed, which would become the Greenbridge-incubator. Together with the University of Ghent several organisations participated in the new incubator, such as the Katholieke Hogeschool Brugge-Oostende, POM West-Vlaanderen,  Plassendale nv. and ADMB. In addition the project received support of the European Community ('5B Phasing out EFRO') and the Flemish Community.

See also
 Science and technology in Flanders
 Science Parks of Wallonia

Further reading
 UGent bouwt haar incubator in Oostende
 Wetenschapspark geopend op Plassendale
 Wetenschapspark Plassendale - RUG Gent

External links
 Ostend Science Park

Science parks in Belgium
Flanders